Will It Snow for Christmas? (original title: Y aura-t-il de la neige à Noël ?) is a 1996 French drama film directed by Sandrine Veysset and produced by Humbert Balsan.

Plot
In a modest market garden in the South of France, a woman raises her seven children alone. They all work hard alongside hired labour and are exploited by the farm owner, who is her lover and the father of the children, an unfeeling and demanding man who lives on a nearby estate with his legally married wife. Through her unconditional love, the mother strives to preserve the world of her children. She would rather bring them up in the country than in the town, without resources.

Cast 
 Dominique Reymond as The mother
 Daniel Duval as The father
 Jessica Martinez as Jeanne
 Alexandre Roger as Bruno
 Xavier Colonna as Pierrot
 Fanny Rochetin as Marie
 Flavie Chimènes as Blandine
 Jérémy Chaix as Paul
 Guillaume Mathonnet as Remi
 Eric Huyard as Yvon
 Loys Cappatti as Bernard
 Marcel Guilloux-Delaunay as The teacher

Accolades

References

External links 
 

1996 films
1990s Christmas drama films
Adultery in films
1990s French-language films
Films about children
Films about domestic violence
Films set in France
Best First Feature Film César Award winners
Louis Delluc Prize winners
French Christmas drama films
1996 directorial debut films
1996 drama films
1990s French films